Manduca fosteri is a moth of the family Sphingidae first described by Walter Rothschild and Karl Jordan in 1906. It is known from Paraguay and southern Brazil.

References

Manduca
Moths described in 1906
Taxa named by Karl Jordan
Taxa named by Walter Rothschild